Chattanooga Red Wolves Soccer Club is an American professional soccer club based in East Ridge, Tennessee. They are a founding member of USL League One, the third division of American soccer. The club was announced as a member of League One on August 1, 2018. The Red Wolves play their homes games at CHI Memorial Stadium, Tennessee's First Professional Soccer-Specific Stadium. The club also fields two semi-professional teams called the Dalton Red Wolves and Park City Red Wolves in USL League Two.

History
On August 1, 2018, it was announced by the United Soccer League that Chattanooga would be granted a side to play in their newly created third division for 2019. A month later, on September 11, 2018, the club announced their first head coach, Tim Hankinson. The club then officially announced their name, Chattanooga Red Wolves SC, on September 25, 2018.

On November 21, 2019, the Red Wolves announced Jimmy Obleda as their new head coach and technical director.

On June 8, 2021, CRWSC announced that the Lady Red Wolves would join the newly created USL W League as a founding member and begin play in 2022.

On July 22, 2022, coach Obleda was placed on a provisional suspension pending the results of an investigation into allegations of misconduct brought forth by the USL Players Association. The United Soccer League Players Association lost confidence in the Chattanooga Red Wolves handling of the investigation, and filed a report with the U.S. Center for SafeSport asking them to investigate.

On December 14, 2022, the Red Wolves announced Jeff "Ziggy" Korytowski as their new head coach

Owner 
In coordination with the United Soccer League, Robert "Bob" Martino founded the Chattanooga Red Wolves Soccer Club in 2018 and is currently developing the amenities surrounding the state’s first professional soccer stadium, CHI Memorial Stadium, totaling a $150 million investment in the area. In addition to the Red Wolves professional franchise in Chattanooga, Martino is the owner of the Park City Red Wolves and the Dalton Red Wolves, both members of the USL League Two division.

Martino’s portfolio includes significant real estate investment and development, as well as construction of residential properties and mixed-use communities. In Utah, Martino has developed and redeveloped office space, medical offices, multi-family housing and commercial space, as well as sports-related complexes for soccer and golf.

Martino is a graduate of Ohio State University with a degree in accounting and is married to wife, Lana, with whom he has three sons.

Stadium

On April 25, 2019, the club announced plans for a new soccer-specific stadium for the team in the Chattanooga suburb of East Ridge, Tennessee which will be part of a 100-acre, $125 million development including hotels, condominiums, apartments, retail shops, restaurants and convention space.

On March 5, 2020, the Red Wolves announced that CHI Memorial Hospital, a part of the Catholic Health Initiatives hospital system, would be the name sponsor for the stadium.

In spring of 2021, construction of the stadium’s jumbotron was complete. The 33’ X 62’ screen features in-game scoring and statistics, live video feeds and instant replays. CHI Memorial Stadium’s Executive Club and Sky Suites building, which will include eight suites and a restaurant-bar, are currently under construction.

Players and staff

Current roster

Technical staff

Statistics and records

Season-by-season

Head coach records
 Includes USL Regular Season, USL Playoffs, U.S. Open Cup. Excludes friendlies.

See also

 USL League One

References

External links

 

 
Soccer clubs in Tennessee
Association football clubs established in 2018
2018 establishments in Tennessee
USL League One teams
Sports in Chattanooga, Tennessee